Emily Roya O'Brien (born 28 May 1985) is an English three-time Daytime Emmy-nominated actress and writer who is known for her five-year series regular role of Jana Hawkes Fisher on The Young and the Restless from 2006–2011. She portrayed the voice of The Woman in Love Death and Robots Season 1 episode of The Witness, directed by Alberto Mielgo, which won The Emmy for Best Animation. She went on to portray motion capture and the voice of Eve in Season 2 of Love Death and Robots entitled Pop Squad. She also portrayed Julia in the 2014 film Pernicious and provided the voices of Camille and Samira in League Of Legends, and Y'shtola in Final Fantasy XIV: A Realm Reborn. Emily also voiced Gamora in Guardians of the Galaxy: The Telltale Series and Special Agent Iman Avesta in the 2017 video game Batman: The Enemy Within. In 2018, she became part of the main cast of the animated film Dagon Troll World Chronicles. She also voiced Amelie and young Bridget Strand in the 2019 game Death Stranding. In 2020, O'Brien joined the cast of Days of Our Lives and currently portrays the character Gwen Rizczech, the daughter of Jack Deveraux (Matthew Ashford) on the daytime drama.

Life and career
Emily O'Brien was in plays at Carlsbad High School, where she graduated in 2003, and at MiraCosta College, where she completed a theater major in 2005. In 2005, she graduated with a degree in theater from Mira Costa College.

She was named a finalist in the Kennedy Center American College Theater Festival’s Irene Ryan Acting Competition in 2005, where she was pitted against several hundred students from colleges and universities across the country. She attended Guildhall School of Music and Drama in London, England and wrote, produced and directed her first project Beatrice in 2011 which won best film at BIFF.

She portrayed Jana Hawkes Fisher in The Young and the Restless. O'Brien was nominated for three Daytime Emmy Awards for her performance in The Young and the Restless. She portrayed the role again in November 2008, when a parody of the show was the theme of the 1st showcase on The Price Is Right. O'Brien portrayed the role initially on a recurring status from 11 May to 5 September 2006, and then on contract from 10 October 2006 to 20 February 2007, when the character disappeared from the canvas temporarily until her return on 15 June 2007. O'Brien earned two Daytime Emmy Award nominations for Outstanding Younger Actress in 2008 and 2009. In March 2011, news broke that O'Brien had been let go from The Young and the Restless, with her final airdate on 6 May 2011. Prior to her dismissal, O'Brien was pre-nominated for another Daytime Emmy in the same category.

O’Brien is in much demand as a voice actor, and provided the voices of Y'Shtola in Final Fantasy XIV: A Realm Reborn, Camille in League Of Legends, Faris Scherwiz in World of Final Fantasy, and Veruca Salt in Tom and Jerry: Willy Wonka and the Chocolate Factory.

Emily then portrayed Julia in the 2014 supernatural horror film Pernicious, directed by James Cullen Bressack.

She also voiced Gamora in the Telltale video game, Guardians of the Galaxy: The Telltale Series. She has received wide recognition for her portrayal of Special Agent Iman Avesta in Batman: The Enemy Within, a fan of Batman. O'Brien is partially deaf, and teared up having to voice a scene where the character could be rendered deaf by the Riddler. While the game itself was moderately received, her performance was generally praised by critics.

In 2018, she briefly played Jillian Marshall in the Focus on the Family radio program Adventures in Odyssey. That same year, she provided the voice of Renee Chandler in the CW Seed animated series Constantine: City of Demons. She also appeared as the suspicious Portia in the thriller Dangerous Matrimony, then signed on to play the voice of Ruth the human mother and wife of the Ambassador of Earth in the upcoming dark fantasy motion comic Dagon Troll World Chronicles that is set to be released in 2021. She reprised the role of Gamora in Marvel: Ultimate Alliance 3: The Black Order.

O'Brien appeared in Hideo Kojima's 2019 game Death Stranding as the voices of Bridget and the young Amelie Strand, characters using the likeness of Lindsay Wagner. She has several projects in hand that are currently in post-production, like Vampire Dad, Iris, and Beautifully Flawed.

In May 2020, it was announced that O'Brien had joined the cast of Days of Our Lives in the role of Gwen Rizczech. She made her first appearance on 1 June of the same year.

Personal life
Her mother is Persian and her father is British & Irish. Emily's parents, Flora and Michael, say, “Acting is the only thing she wanted to do.” She has a sister named Natalie. O'Brien speaks Persian fluently and has studied French and Spanish. She was born and raised in England and is capable of multiple British dialects plus various other European accents. She also sings professionally and is currently the national narrator for the eBay and PayPal campaign.

Filmography

Other
 2009: She is featured as the test subject in a TED talk about recreating human faces in digital, photo-realistic quality.
 2016: She voiced Scout Three in Rogue One: Recon A Star Wars 360 Experience.
 2018: She briefly played Jillian Marshall on Adventures in Odyssey.

Awards
ACTF Irene Ryans Theater festival Finalist and 2006 Nominee (2005)
CHS Film Festival: Best Actress of 2003 Best Film (Pleasant Dreams) of 2003 (2003)
DTASC Shakespeare Festival : 3rd place award for Othello (2003)
BEST FEST San Diego Film Festival (2003) 3rd place award for Pleasant Dreams
Team Power Award Don't Drink the Water from the city of Carlsbad (2002)
Daytime Emmy Award Nomination: Outstanding Younger Actress in a Drama Series (2008 Nominee)
Daytime Emmy Award Nomination: Outstanding Younger Actress in a Drama Series (2009 Nominee)
Daytime Emmy Award Nomination: Outstanding Younger Actress in a Drama Series (2011 Nominee)

References

External links
 
 The Digital Emily Project: Achieving a Photoreal Digital Actor
  Today’s Local News » Restless no more - Emily O'Brien
 Emily O'Brien

Living people
English film actresses
English soap opera actresses
English video game actresses
English people of Iranian descent
21st-century Iranian actresses
English voice actresses
Place of birth missing (living people)
People from Carlsbad, California
21st-century English actresses
English feminists
1985 births